is a 2011 Japanese film directed by Futoshi Sato.

Cast
 Kasumi Arimura as Asami Ōta  
 Seika Taketomi as Yū
 Moe Arai as Hiroko Kikuchi
 Hiroki Matsukata as Oda Nobunaga
 Mariko Shinoda as Nene
 Kyousuke Hamao as Yohei
 Shiori Ogiso as Mayu
 Yuria Kizaki as Nao
 Kento Kaku as Kōhei
 Ren Mori as Takuya
 Shogo Suzuki as Rikichi
 Keisuke Sohma as Gosaku

References

External links
 
 
 ギャルバサラ 戦国時代は圏外です (2011) at allcinema 
 ギャルバサラ 戦国時代は圏外です at KINENOTE 

Films directed by Futoshi Sato
2010s Japanese films